Manya may refer to:

Manya (actress), an Indian actress
Manya, Victoria, a locality in Australia
Manya Pathak, an Indian actress
Manya language, spoken in Guinea
, a ship

See Also
Mánya (disambiguation)